Theodore A. Burczak (born August 15, 1964)  is an American economist and a professor of economics at Denison University in Granville, Ohio, where he teaches courses on macroeconomics, economic justice, monetary theory, and the history of economic thought. He is best known for his development of a socialist economic model designed to bypass the dispersed knowledge problems elaborated on by Friedrich Hayek as facets of the economic calculation problem, writing in his book Socialism After Hayek (Advances in Heterodox Economics), "my aim...is developing a 'libertarian Marxist' conception of socialism, a socialism committed to forms of procedural and distributive justice that are central to the Marxian tradition and a socialism keenly aware of the factual and ethical knowledge problems emphasized by Hayek."

External links 
 Socialism After Hayek

References 

1964 births
Living people
21st-century American economists
Denison University faculty